The UEFA Women's Cup 2005–06 was the fifth edition of the UEFA Women's Cup football club tournament. It was won by 1. FFC Frankfurt in an all-German final against defending champions FFC Turbine Potsdam for their second title in the competition.

First qualifying round

Group A1

Group A2

Group A3

Group A4

Group A5

Group A6

Group A7

Group A8

Group A9

Second qualifying round

Group B1

Group B2

Group B3

Group B4

Quarter-finals

First Leg

Second Leg

Semi-finals

First Leg

Second Leg

Final

First Leg

Second Leg

Top goalscorers 
(excluding qualifying rounds)

External links
 2005–06 season at UEFA website
 UEFA Women's Cup results at RSSSF

Women's Cup
UEFA Women's Champions League seasons
UEFA
UEFA